Francesco Piccolo may refer to:
 Francesco Piccolo (born 1964), Italian writer and screenwriter
 Francesco Piccolo (politician), leader of the Venetian People's Movement
 Francisco María Piccolo (1654–1729), Sicilia Jesuit active in as a missionary  in Mexico